Stade Municipal de Jendouba is a multi-use stadium in Jendouba, Tunisia.  It is used by football team Jendouba Sport. The stadium has a capacity of 8,000 people.

References 

Jendouba